The Chilahati–Parbatipur–Santahar–Darshana line  is a railway line connecting Chilahati and Darshana, via  Parbatipur Junction, Santahar, Abdulpur, Azim Nagar station (in Gopālpur, Lalpur Upazila), Iswardi and Hardinge Bridge in Bangladesh. This track is under the jurisdiction of Bangladesh Railway.

History

From 1878, the railway route from Kolkata, then called Calcutta, to Siliguri was in two laps. The first lap was a  journey along the Eastern Bengal State Railway from Calcutta Station (later renamed Sealdah) to Damookdeah Ghat on the southern bank of the Padma River, then across the river in a ferry and the second lap of the journey. A  metre gauge line of the North Bengal Railway linked Saraghat on the northern bank of the Padma to Siliguri.
 
In 1916 the metre-gauge section north of the bridge was converted to broad gauge, and so the entire Calcutta - Siliguri route became broad-gauge.

With the partition of India in 1947, the portions of the track in East Pakistan territory, later Bangladesh territory in 1971, got separated. The southern portion through Gede is still functional and Maitree Express runs to Kolkata on this track.

Branch lines
Sara–Sirajganj Railway Company constructed the  Sara–Sirajganj line in 1915–16.

Presently the line is up to Balashi Ghat in Phulchhari Upazila.

North Bengal state railway opened a metre gauge line to Kaunia in 1879. Two narrow gauge lines were laid by Eastern Bengal Railway from Kaunia to Dharla River, thereby creating the Kaunia–Dharlla State Railway.

References

External links

Dual gauge railways in Bangladesh
Parbatipur Upazila